The School of Information Studies (SOIS) is an academic unit of the University of Wisconsin–Milwaukee. SOIS is a member of the iSchools consortium.

Academic programs 
 Bachelor of Science in Information Science & Technology (BSIST)
 Master of Science in Information Science & Technology (MSIST)
 Master of Library & Information Science (MLIS)
 Ph.D. in Information Studies

Research groups
The school houses UW-Milwaukee's Center for Information Policy Research, Research Group for Information Retrieval, Information Intelligence and Architecture Research Lab, the Knowledge Organization Research Group (KOrg), and the Social Studies of Information Research Group (SSIRG).

Rankings
In 2013 U.S. News & World Report ranked the school 15th nationally among Library and Information Science schools. SOIS ranks 4th internationally and 2nd in the US/Canada in department contributions to library and information science (LIS) literature (2007 - 2012) as reported in a recent study in the Journal of the Association for Information Science and Technology by Walters & Wilder.

The school was recognized by UNESCO as one of the "leading international academic institutions" for its "ongoing role in promoting e-government and information ethics initiatives in Africa" in 2009.

Notable people
Peter Johan Lor, adjunct instructor
Hope A. Olson, professor emeritus
Richard P. Smiraglia, professor emeritus

References

External links
University of Wisconsin–Milwaukee School of Information Studies
Center for Information Policy Research
Social Studies of Information Research Group

Information schools
University of Wisconsin–Milwaukee